Venezuela  competed at the 2011 Pan American Games in Guadalajara, Mexico from October 14 to 30, 2011. Venezuela's flag bearer (swimmer Andreina Pinto) was selected by an online vote by the general public. Venezuela competed with 388 athletes in 31 sports.

Medalists

Archery

Venezuela has qualified three male and three female athletes in the archery competition.

Men

Women

Athletics

Venezuela has qualified an athletics team.

Men
Track and road events

Field events

Combined Event

Women
Track and road events

Field events

Combined Event

Badminton

Venezuela has qualified four male and four female athletes in the badminton competition.

Men

Women

Mixed

Baseball

Venezuela has qualified a team of twenty-three athletes in the baseball competition.

Team

Ronald Acuña
Luis Jose Alen
Gabriel Alfaro
Oscar David Angulo
Juan Aponte
Luis Azocar
Jhonny Caraballo
Rodolfo Cardona
Josmar Carreno
Dirimo Chavez
Juan Colmenarez
George Delgado
Juan Fuentes
Antonio Jose Granadillo
Hebert Lara
Carlos Enrique Mory
Jesus Reyes
Arturo Rivas
Yonathan Sivira
Luis Torres
Saul Torres
Wuillians Vasquez
Jesus Maria Yepez

Group B

Fifth place match

Basque pelota

Venezuela has qualified two athletes each in the paleta rubber pairs trinkete, paleta leather pairs 36m fronton, mano doubles 36m fronton, paleta leather pairs 30m fronton, and the women's frontenis pairs 30m fronton categories and one athlete each in the mano singles trinkete and mano singles 30m fronton categories.

Men

Women

Beach volleyball

Venezuela has qualified a men's team in the beach volleyball competition.

Men

Bowling

Venezuela has qualified two male and two female athletes in the bowling competition.

Men
Individual

Pairs

Women
Individual

Pairs

Boxing

Venezuela has qualified 8 athletes in the 56 kg, 60 kg, 64 kg, 69 kg, 75 kg, 91 kg and 91+kg men's categories and one athlete in the 51 kg women's category.

Men

Women

Canoeing

Venezuela has qualified seven boats for male events and 4 boats for female events.

Men

Women

Cycling

Venezuela has qualified a full cycling team.

Road cycling

Men

Women

Track cycling

Sprints & Pursuit

Keirin

Omnium

Mountain biking
Men

Women

BMX

Diving

Venezuela will send 7 divers (4 male, 3 female) to the Pan American Games

Men

Women

Equestrian

Venezuela qualified 12 athletes (8 male, 4 female) in all equestrian events

Dressage

Eventing

Individual jumping

Team jumping

Fencing

Venezuela has qualified athletes in all fencing events (men's & women's épée, foil, and sabre).

Men

Women

Gymnastics

Artistic
Venezuela has qualified two male and six female gymnasts in the artistic gymnastics competition.

Men
Individual qualification

Individual Finals

Women
Individual qualification & Team Finals

Individual Finals

Rhythmic
Venezuela has qualified two individual gymnasts and one team in the rhythmic gymnastics competition.

Individual

Group

Handball

Men

Team

Ali Barranco
Enmanuel Godoy
Jesus Guarecuco
Victor Alonzo Lopez
Arturo Martinez
Jhonny Peñaloza
Ivan Josue Perez
Eduardo Rodriguez
Raul Jose Rodriguez
Drubil Silva
Christofer Timaure
Ronal Timaure
Emilio Tovar
Juan Villalobos
Kelwing Zambrano

Standings

Results

Fifth-Eighth place matches

Seventh place match

Judo

Venezuela has qualified athletes in all men's categories and in six of the seven women's categories.

Men

Repechage Rounds

Women

Repechage Rounds

Karate

Venezuela has qualified three athletes in the 67 kg, 84 kg, and 84+kg men's categories and four athletes in the 50 kg, 61 kg, 68 kg, and 68+kg women's categories.

Modern pentathlon

Venezuela has qualified two male and one female pentathletes.

Men

Women

Racquetball

Venezuela has qualified three male and two female athletes in the racquetball competition.

Men

Women

Roller skating

Venezuela has qualified a men's speed team in the roller skating competition.

Men

Women

Rowing

Men

Women

Sailing

Venezuela has qualified five boats and six athletes in the sailing competition.

Men

Women

Open

Shooting

Men

Women

Softball

Venezuela has qualified a team to participate. The team will be made up of 17 athletes.

Standings
The top four teams will advance to the semifinal round.

Semifinals

Swimming

Venezuela will send 27 swimmers.

Men

 Swimmers who participated in the heats only.

Women

 Swimmers who participated in the heats only.

Synchronized swimming

Venezuela has qualified one pair of athletes to compete in the duet synchronized swimming competition.

Table tennis

Venezuela has qualified three male and three female athletes in the table tennis competition.

Men

Women

Taekwondo

Venezuela has qualified four athletes in the 58 kg, 68 kg, 80 kg and 80+kg men's categories and two athletes in the 57 kg and 67 kg women's categories.

Men

Women

Tennis

Men

Women

Mixed

Triathlon
American

Men

Women

Volleyball

Men

Squad

Luis Arias
Daniel Artega
Jesus Chourio
Josher Contreras
Daniel Escobar
Ivan Marquez
Hector Mata
Maximo Montoya
Carlos Paez
Angel Petit
Kervin Piñeura
Emerson Rodríguez

Fifth to eighth place classification

Seventh place match

Water polo

Men

Team

Victor Bautista
Simon Botto
Eduardo Vortez
Douglas Espinioza
Isaias Fernandez
Jimmy Ferraz
Joaquin Lopez

Jorge Henriquez
Carlos Linares
Oliver Lopez
Antonio Pirela
Pedro Polanco
Erick Rodulfo

The men's team will compete in Group B.

Elimination stage

Crossover

Seventh place match

Women

Team

Gregory Aguilar
Patsy Alas
Yineldy Araujo
Alexandra Carangelo
Bredy Contreras
Ariadna Fernandez
Rocio Galue

Lorena Godoy
Poema Juliao
Soleilyn Martinez
Franjelis Pitter
Mildre Ramirez
Stephany Rivero

The women's team will compete in Group A.

Elimination stage

Crossover

Seventh place match

Weightlifting

Wrestling

Venezuela has qualified six athletes in the 55 kg, 60 kg, 66 kg, 74 kg, 84 kg, and 96 kg men's freestyle categories, six athletes in the 55 kg, 60 kg, 66 kg, 84 kg, 96 kg, and 120 kg men's Greco-Roman categories, and three athletes in the 55 kg, 63 kg, and 72 kg women's freestyle categories.

Men
Freestyle

Greco-Roman
{| class="wikitable" style="font-size:90%;"
|-
!rowspan=2|Athlete
!rowspan=2|Event
!Round of 16
!Quarterfinals
!Semifinals
!Final
|-
!OppositionResult
!OppositionResult
!OppositionResult
!OppositionResult
|-
|Jorge Cardozo
|55 kg
|bgcolor=wheat|
|align=center|W PO 3 – 0
|align=center|W PO 3 – 0
|align=center|L PP 1 – 3
|-
|German Diaz
|60 kg
|bgcolor=wheat|
|align=center|W PP 3 – 1
|align=center|W PP 3 – 1
|align=center|W PO 3 – 0
|-
|Manuel Torres
|66 kg
|bgcolor=wheat|
|align=center|L PO 0 – 3
| style="text-align:center;" colspan="7"|did not advance
|-
|Yorgen Cova
|84 kg
|bgcolor=wheat|
|align=center|W PO 3 – 0
|align=center|L PO 0 – 3
|align=center|Bronze Medal match:W PO 3 – 0
|-
|Erwin Caraballo
|96 kg
|bgcolor=wheat|
|align=center|L PP 0 – 31
|bgcolor=wheat|
|align=center|Bronze Medal match:''W PO 3 – 0
|-
|Rafael Barreno
|120 kg
|bgcolor=wheat|
|align=center|W PO 3 – 0
|align=center|W PO 3 – 0
|align=center|L ST 0 – 4|}Women'''
Freestyle

References

Nations at the 2011 Pan American Games
P
2011